The National Science Museum is a national science museum in Daejeon, South Korea. It first opened in Seoul in 1926 and became a national museum in 1949. It moved to its current location in 1990 which is across the street from Expo Park which housed the Daejeon Expo in 1993. It received 1,795,076 visitors in 2017.

See also
Gwacheon National Science Museum
List of museums in South Korea
Daejeon Convention Center

References

External links
 Official Site of the National Science Museum of South Korea (English)

National museums of South Korea